Potential future exposure (PFE) is the maximum expected credit exposure over a specified period of time calculated at some level of confidence (i.e. at a given quantile).

PFE is a measure of counterparty risk/credit risk. It is calculated by evaluating existing trades done against the possible market prices in future during the lifetime of transactions. It can be called sensitivity of risk with respect to market prices. The calculated expected maximum exposure value is not to be confused with the maximum credit exposure possible. Instead, the maximum credit exposure indicated by the PFE analysis is an upper bound on a confidence interval for future credit exposure.

Credit risk managers have traditionally remained focused on current exposure measurement (i.e., current mark-to-market exposure, plus outstanding receivables) and collateral management. The problem with this focus is that it places excessive emphasis on the present and fails to provide an acceptable indication of credit risk at some point in the future. Because losses from credit risk take a relatively long time to evolve, a more useful measure of exposure is potential exposure. Potential exposure is not like current exposure. It exists in the future and therefore represents a range or distribution of outcomes rather than a single point estimate.

Relevance

PFE is essential to bank regulation under Basel III and Dodd Frank.
Fundamentally, to assess the safety of a bank's asset portfolio and the adequacy of its Tier 1 capital (and Tier 2 capital), one needs to evaluate whether it is resilient under severely stressing market moves. Because PFE is a measure of credit exposure, the most relevant stress move for PFE are not those where a large trading loss occurs (as they are when considering an institution's market risk). Instead, the scenarios of significant PFE can often be where the institution makes a large "paper" profit with a counterparty; and therefore accrues a large unsecured claim on that counterparty (a claim that the counterparty may be unable to pay). For example, a trader might buy cheap insurance contracts against a rare but catastrophic risk. The vast majority of the time – and for many years running – the trader will make a small annual loss (the CDS premium) even if the trade has positive expected value. When the rare event occurs, the trader may suddenly have a huge windfall "profit" claim against whoever wrote the "insurance". And this would mean a sudden increase in the relevance of whether or not the 'insurance writing' counterparty can actually pay. The possibility that the counterparty cannot pay (this huge new claim) would create a systematically important difference between the theoretical-credit-risk-free profits of the trader (and his institution) and his realized year end profit. Since institutional market risks are hedged, this difference could impact the institution's capital not merely as a failure to make excess profits, but actually as a significant net loss (due to losses on the offsetting hedge position). And potentially, exposure to such credit losses could make the "profit-making" trader's institution fail (and default on its own obligations to other companies) thereby causing other companies to suffer credit risk losses and fail (in the same way). The theoretical potential for a cascading series of institutional failures (caused by sudden rises in PFE) is apparent. The cost of avoiding or dealing with these risks can fall on the public (the vast majority of whom will not gain directly from the institutional profits made while accruing large PFE claims). This is for two main reasons. First, government directly (or indirectly) insures many retail deposits (to prevent bank runs and to promote savings), and many quasi-government agencies (e.g.: FNMA, Freddie Mac) have de facto government backing. Second, even when a major firm does not have government insured deposits, it can be "systemically important" (such as AIG) – its failure would potentially cause panic, destroy market liquidity, and precipitate a crash and potential widespread economic contraction / depression. One plan that is intended to reduce the public cost (& private benefit) of the implicit support to "too big to fail" institutions is to reduce the variability and scale of PFE by incentivizing collateralization.

Expected exposure 
The expected exposure (EE) is defined similarly to the PFE, except that the average is used instead of a specific quantile.

The EE represents the estimated average loss at a specific future point of time that a lender would suffer from if the borrower (counterparty) fully defaults on his debt (i.e. if the loss given default (LGD) was 100%).

See also 
 Credit valuation adjustment

External links
 – Basel III, International Regulatory Frameworks for Banks.

Credit risk
Financial risk
Investment
Monte Carlo methods in finance